Tiger Huang (born 21 June 1963) is a Taiwanese singer.

She is known for her unique voice and cover versions of songs by other artists. Huang was named Best New Artist at the 1990 Golden Melody Awards. She first performed at the Taipei live house EZ5 when it opened in 1990, and held frequent shows there.

Awards and nominations

References

1963 births
Living people
Musicians from Kaohsiung
20th-century Taiwanese women singers
21st-century Taiwanese women singers